"Head over Heels" is a song by the all-female pop rock/new wave band the Go-Go's, released in 1984 as the first single from their third studio album, Talk Show. The song was written by band members Charlotte Caffey and Kathy Valentine, and produced by English record producer Martin Rushent. The Go-Gos' rhythm guitarist Jane Wiedlin has cited "Head over Heels" as her favorite Go-Go's song, describing it as "just a classic. Like a little pop truffle of chocolate that's just completely delicious."

Reception
The song was the most successful of the album's three singles, peaking at number 11 on the US Billboard Hot 100. It also spent three weeks at number 10 on the US Cash Box Top 100.

Cash Box said that the song demonstrates that the group has lost none of their vitality and energy and that "Belinda Carlisle's voice seems to have taken on a deeper, richer resonance that marks the bands maturation as recording artists."

Chart performance

Weekly charts

Year-end charts

References

External links
 

1984 songs
1984 singles
The Go-Go's songs
Songs written by Charlotte Caffey
Songs written by Kathy Valentine
Song recordings produced by Martin Rushent
I.R.S. Records singles